Chen Xianjun (born 14 July 1974) is a Chinese sport shooter who competed in the 1996 Summer Olympics.

References

1974 births
Living people
Chinese male sport shooters
ISSF rifle shooters
Olympic shooters of China
Shooters at the 1996 Summer Olympics
20th-century Chinese people